The Railroad Works is a 1985 video game published by CBS Software.

Gameplay
The Railroad Works is a game in which model railroad construction is simulated.

Reception
Mike Markowitz reviewed the game for Computer Gaming World, and stated that "TRW is not a complete simulation of railroading, or even of model railroading, but it is great fun."

References

External links
Review in InCider
Review in Hardcore Computist
Review in Ahoy!

1985 video games
Apple II games
CBS Software games
Commodore 64 games
DOS games
Train simulation video games
Video games developed in the United States